Wong Kar-wai (born 17 July 1958) is a Hong Kong filmmaker. He has received awards and nominations from organisations around the world, recognising his achievements as a director, screenwriter, and producer.

Awards

See also

Wong Kar-wai filmography

External links
Wong Kar-wai – Awards at the Internet Movie Database

Wong Kar-wai